

References

 
 
 

Chemical data pages
Chemical data pages cleanup